Hopea is a genus of plants in the family Dipterocarpaceae. The genus was named after John Hope, 1725–1786, the first Regius Keeper of the Royal Botanic Garden, Edinburgh. It contains some 113 species, distributed from Sri Lanka and southern India to southern China, and southward throughout Malesia to New Guinea. They are mainly main and subcanopy trees of lowland rainforest, but some species can become also emergent trees, such as Hopea nutans.

Species accepted:

Other species recently used, but now not accepted include:
Hopea exalata, now a synonym of Hopea reticulata
Hopea kitulgallensis, not now accepted
Hopea malabarica, now a synonym of Hopea racophloea
Hopea quisumbingiana, not now accepted
Hopea siamensis, now a synonym of Hopea pierrei
Hopea wightiana Wall., now a synonym of Hopea ponga

Gallery

References

 
Malvales genera
Taxonomy articles created by Polbot